Where Are We Going, Dad? 2 is a 2015 Chinese reality children's family film directed by Xie Dikui and Lin Yan. It was released on February 19, 2015.

Cast
Huang Lei
Huang Yici (多多)
Gary Chaw
Joe Chaw
Grace Chaw
Lu Yi
Lu Yuxuan
Yang Wei
YYY
Li Rui

Box office
As of March 1, 2015, the film has grossed over US$34.8 million in China.

See also
Where Are We Going, Dad? (TV series)
Where Are We Going, Dad? (film)

References

Films based on television series
Chinese children's films